Events in the year 1668 in India.

Events
27 July – Bombay is granted to the East India Company.

Births

Deaths

References

 
India
Years of the 17th century in India